Lazarim is a town in Portugal. It is a parish of Lamego Municipality. The population in 2011 was 521, in an area of 16.54 km2.

Shrovetide of Lazarim 
In Lazarim, Carnival is celebrated, which is considered one of the most traditional Shrovetides in Portugal.

The tradition is characterized by the Caretos, an ethnographic parade, and satirical testaments, in a licentiousness coming from times when everything was lived in clandestinity, confronting the institutional and religious authority in force.

The Caretos wear alder wood masks.

References

Freguesias of Lamego